James Martin is an American photojournalist, photo editor, and creative director. He covers Silicon Valley and the broader technology industry.

Martin has photographed the tech pioneers of Google and Facebook, as well as launches at Apple and NASA. He is notable as a documentary and reportage photographer with a love for storytelling and technology. Martin has been the judge of numerous documentary and photojournalism competitions worldwide.

His work has appeared primarily on CBSNews.com and CNET. He has also been featured on CNN, NewYorker.com, the Los Angeles Times, Bloomberg, and CNBC.

Martin is the founder of the Remain In Light photography collective. He attended the University of Colorado in Boulder, Colorado, and has traveled extensively throughout Europe and South America. Currently, he lives and works in San Francisco.

References

External links
 Remain In Light

Living people
American photojournalists
21st-century American photographers
Year of birth missing (living people)